This is an incomplete list of the highest-grossing concert tours. Only tours using reliable references and having grossed over $100 million (adjusted for inflation) have been added to the list. Some of the gross may be higher than reported on this list because not all concerts are reported. Billboard and Pollstar regularly provide the official figure of concerts' gross revenue worldwide.

Tours that span multiple decades are included in the decade that they concluded.

In bold, the tours which, when completed, became the highest-grossing of all time.

Highest-grossing tours

Highest-grossing tours by decade

1980s

1990s

2000s

2010s

2020s

{| class="wikitable sortable"
|+ List of the top 20 highest-grossing tours of the 2020s decade
!Rank
!Actual gross
!Inflation(adjusted  gross)
!Artist
!Tour name
!Year(s)
!Shows
!Attendance
!Averageticket price
!Averagegross (millions)
!Averageattendance
!class="unsortable"|
|-

! 1
|$353,900,031
|
|Harry Styles
|Love On Tour
| style="text-align:center;"| 2021–present
| style="text-align:center;" | 125
| style="text-align:center;" | 2,692,316
| style="text-align:center;" | $
| style="text-align:center;" | $
| style="text-align:center;" | 
| style="text-align:center;"| 
|-

! 2
|$342,192,313
|
|Coldplay
|Music of the Spheres World Tour
| style="text-align:center;"| 2022–present
| style="text-align:center;" | 64
| style="text-align:center;" | 3,802,812
| style="text-align:center;" | $
| style="text-align:center;" | $
| style="text-align:center;" | 
| style="text-align:center;" |
|-

! 3
|$314,445,480
|
|Bad Bunny
|World's Hottest Tour
| style="text-align:center;"|2022
| style="text-align:center;" | 43
| style="text-align:center;" | 1,854,457
| style="text-align:center;" | $
| style="text-align:center;" | $
| style="text-align:center;" | 
| style="text-align:center;"|
|-

! 4
|$245,660,947
|
|Ed Sheeran
|+–=÷x Tour
| style="text-align:center;"| 2022–present
| style="text-align:center;" | 52
| style="text-align:center;" | 3,030,886
| style="text-align:center;" | $
| style="text-align:center;" | $
| style="text-align:center;" | 
| style="text-align:center;"| 
|-

! 5
|$198,094,115
|
|Daddy Yankee
|La Última Vuelta World Tour
| style="text-align:center;"| 2022-2023
| style="text-align:center;" | 83
| style="text-align:center;" | 1,900,953
| style="text-align:center;" | $
| style="text-align:center;" | $
| style="text-align:center;" | 
| style="text-align:center;"| 
|-

! 6
|$175,509,586
|
|Def Leppard and Mötley Crüe
|The Stadium Tour
| style="text-align:center;"| 2022
| style="text-align:center;" | 36
| style="text-align:center;" | 1,341,035
| style="text-align:center;" | $
| style="text-align:center;" | $
| style="text-align:center;" | 
| style="text-align:center;"| 
|-

! 7
|$155,799,293
|
|Red Hot Chili Peppers
|Global Stadium Tour
| style="text-align:center;"| 2022–present
| style="text-align:center;" | 26
| style="text-align:center;" | 1,204,836
| style="text-align:center;" | $
| style="text-align:center;" | $
| style="text-align:center;" | 
| style="text-align:center;"| 
|-

! 8
|$148,363,176
|
|Guns N' Roses
|We're F'N' Back! Tour
| style="text-align:center;"| 2020–present
| style="text-align:center;" | 52
| style="text-align:center;" | 1,499,439
| style="text-align:center;" | $
| style="text-align:center;" | $
| style="text-align:center;" | 
| style="text-align:center;" |
|-

! 9
|$135,259,120
|
|Kenny Chesney
|Here and Now Tour
| style="text-align:center;"|2022
| style="text-align:center;" | 41
| style="text-align:center;" | 1,296,079
| style="text-align:center;" | $
| style="text-align:center;" | $
| style="text-align:center;" | 
| style="text-align:center;"|
|-

! 10
|$131,056,262
|
|The Weeknd
|After Hours til Dawn Tour
| style="text-align:center;"|2022–present
| style="text-align:center;" | 19
| style="text-align:center;" | 904,744
| style="text-align:center;" | $
| style="text-align:center;" | $
| style="text-align:center;" | 
| style="text-align:center;"|
|-

! 11
|$120,755,554
|
|The Rolling Stones
|Sixty
| style="text-align:center;"|2022
| style="text-align:center;" | 14
| style="text-align:center;" | 712,541
| style="text-align:center;" | $
| style="text-align:center;" | $
| style="text-align:center;" | 
| style="text-align:center;"|
|-

! 12
|$116,785,983
|
|Bad Bunny
|El Último Tour del Mundo 2022
| style="text-align:center;"|2022
| style="text-align:center;" | 35
| style="text-align:center;" | 574,868
| style="text-align:center;" | $
| style="text-align:center;" | $
| style="text-align:center;" | 
| style="text-align:center;"|
|-

! 13
|$105,077,787
|
|Paul McCartney
|Got Back
| style="text-align:center;"|2022
| style="text-align:center;" |16
| style="text-align:center;" |423,659
| style="text-align:center;" | $
| style="text-align:center;" |$
| style="text-align:center;" |
| style="text-align:center;"|
|-

! 14
|$100,288,913
|
|Genesis
|The Last Domino? Tour
| style="text-align:center;"| 2021–2022
| style="text-align:center;" | 47
| style="text-align:center;" | 562,579
| style="text-align:center;" | $
| style="text-align:center;" | $
| style="text-align:center;" | 
| style="text-align:center;" |
|}

Highest-grossing tours annually

See also
 List of highest-attended concerts
 List of highest-grossing live music artists

Notes

References

 
Entertainment-related lists of superlatives